Chris Cameron was an All-American lacrosse player at Lehigh University from 1986 to 1989 who twice led the nation in scoring.

Playing career
Cameron is among the all-time leaders in Division I scoring with 122 goal and 186 assists for 308 career points. 

Cameron played his prep ball at Walt Whitman on Long Island before being recruited to Lehigh.

Chris's top season was 1986 when he scored 40 goals and handed out 53 assists for 93 total point in 14 games while leading the nation in scoring that season. Cameron's senior season, he was voted All-American and was selected to play in the North-South All-Star Classic. He led the Engineers to an 8-6 record in 1986 and 9-5 in 1987, and was also inducted into the Lehigh University Hall of Fame. Cameron was the 4th player in NCAA Division I to surpass 300 career points. 

Cameron also excelled at soccer where he helped lead Lehigh to a 13-5-2 record in his senior season while serving as captain and being named a Regional All-American. Cameron played professional lacrosse for the National Lacrosse League's Boston Blazers from 1992 to 1994, tallying a total of 11 goals and 22 assists in 19 games.

Coaching career
Cameron is currently the lacrosse coach at Bishop Guertin High School in New Hampshire. Bishop Guertin won the New Hampshire Division 1 state titles in 2005 and 2008. Bishop Guertin also reached the state finals in 2009, losing the title game 9-8, while finishing the season with an 18-3 record. In 2010, Bishop Guertin again won the state finals with a 15 to 10 defeat of Exeter High School finishing with a 19 and 2 overall record. Most recently, he led his team to a 2012 championship victory against Hanover and 2013 victory against Pinkerton Academy. In 2014, Bishop Guertin won their fifth straight NH 1 state title.

In twelve seasons under Cameron, Bishop Guertin has a record of 198 wins and 48 losses.

Cameron is the father of Kristin, Brian, and Sean.

Statistics

Lehigh University

(a) 9th in NCAA career assists
(b) 14th in NCAA career points
(c) 12th in NCAA career points-per-game


NLL



See also
Lehigh Mountain Hawks men's lacrosse
NCAA Men's Division I Lacrosse Records

External References
 Chris Cameron Former Lehigh Lacrosse Star Finds Things Different In Pro League, The Morning Call, Feb 28, 1991

References

American lacrosse players
Lehigh Mountain Hawks men's lacrosse players
Living people
Year of birth missing (living people)
Lehigh Mountain Hawks men's soccer players
High school lacrosse coaches in the United States
Lacrosse players from New York (state)
Soccer players from New York (state)
Boston Blazers players
Association footballers not categorized by position
Association football players not categorized by nationality